Kaise Huaye Benaam is a Pakistani romantic drama series, produced by Merajuddin and  Ahsan Khan under their production banner Real Entertainment. The drama airs  weekly on Geo Entertainment every Thursday. Serial included ensemble names from Pakistani industry; Ahsan Khan, Neelam Munir, Noman Ijaz and Maria Wasti in lead roles.

Cast
Ahsan Khan
Nauman Ijaz as Faris
Neelam Muneer as Rania
Maria Wasti as Shehrina
Noor Zafar Khan
Azra Aftab
Raheela Agha as Shehryar's mother
Noor ul Hassan
Nargis Rasheed
Beena Chaudhary as Shabana
Salina Sipra
Imran Urooj

References

Pakistani romantic drama television series
Geo TV original programming
2015 Pakistani television series debuts